Le Rubis (S 601), initially named Provence, was a first-generation nuclear attack submarine and lead boat of the  of the French Navy, assigned to the attack nuclear submarine squadron.

Construction 
The submarine was originally namesaked Provence and was renamed Rubis on 18 December 1980. Being the lead ship of the class, fine-tuning was long, notably needing over 1,000 hours of underwater testing before commissioning. Rubis was fielded on 11 December 1976 and launched on 7 July 1979.

Active service
The Rubis commenced active service on 23 February 1983.

Later in 1991, the Rubis formed part of the French naval contribution to the Gulf War. Soon after, on 17 July 1993, Rubis collided with the tanker Lyria, as the Rubis was surfacing, causing minor damage and injuries. On 18 July 1996, the fourragère of the Ordre de la Libération was awarded to the submarine and the crew, as a legacy of the Rubis of the Second World War, which had been awarded the medal.

The Rubis also took part in Operation Trident, the 1999 bombing campaign over Yugoslavia, by protecting the aeronaval group. Along with the Améthyste, the boat was one of the two submarines who interdicted the Kotor straits to the Serbian Navy, thus effectively forbidding its use. The boat also gathered information for the coalition.

In 2002, the Rubis protected Task Force 473 in the Indian Ocean, during Operation Hercules, the naval part of the invasion of Afghanistan.

On 30 March 2007, while submerged, Rubis hit the bottom, damaging her bow and sonar. The boat returned to operations in July 2008.
 
Rubis was expected to be decommissioned in the beginning of 2017 but underwent modernization and returned to service in 2019. She was then scheduled to be withdrawn from service toward the end of 2022. In the summer of 2022 the boat undertook its final operational mission. She was decommissioned in Cherbourg on 2 December 2022.

Awards and honours

Since 5 June 2012, the fanion of Rubis was decorated with the Cross for Military Valour with one palm.

See also
 List of submarines of France

References and notes 

Rubis-class submarines
Ships built in France
1979 ships
Submarines of France